Valea Nucarilor is a commune in Tulcea County, Northern Dobruja, Romania. It is composed of three villages: Agighiol, Iazurile (formerly Calica) and Valea Nucarilor (formerly Sarighiol de Vale and Ion Gheorghe Duca).

References

Communes in Tulcea County
Localities in Northern Dobruja